J. Wray and Nephew Ltd. is a distiller, blender, and bottler of rum,  originating and operating in Jamaica.

History
The history of J. Wray and Nephew began in 1825 when company founder John Wray opened 'The Shakespeare Tavern' in Kingston, Jamaica. Kingston grew steadily and eventually became Jamaica's capital in 1877, and The Shakespeare Tavern became highly successful.

In 1860 Wray brought in Charles James Ward, the son of his brother, to run the business side of the company.  Ward was a dynamic and gifted entrepreneur, and under his leadership J. Wray and Nephew began a period of growth and prosperity. Wray retired in 1862 and died in 1870 leaving Ward as the sole proprietor of the business.

Ward developed the tavern and liquor-dealing concern into one of Jamaica's largest exporting commercial enterprises. At the International Exhibition held in London in 1862, J. Wray and Nephew won three gold medals for its 10-, 15- and 25-year-old rums. The Company's rums also won several awards and prizes at international exhibitions in Paris – 1878, Amsterdam – 1883, New Orleans – 1885 and Jamaica 1891. 

In 1916, Lindo Brothers & Co purchased Wray & Nephew. Almost immediately thereafter, the new company, J. Wray & Nephew Ltd., purchased the Appleton Estates, a plantation which had produced rum throughout the period of chattel slavery. The Appleton Estate distillery was established in 1749.

At the end of 2012, Italian spirits company Gruppo Campari purchased Wray & Nephew.

In 1997, Joy Spence was made the master blender at J. Wray and Nephew – the first woman ever to occupy this position in the industry.

It is said that 90% of rum sales in Jamaica are of this famous brand, used in Jamaican rum punches, Mai Tais and daiquiris.

Products
Rums currently produced by J. Wray & Nephew include:

 Wray & Nephew White Overproof Rum (the flagship brand, 63% ABV)
 J. Wray Gold Jamaican Rum
 Sainsbury's Superior Dark Rum (Gold medal winner in the Rum category at the 2010 International Wine and Spirit Awards)
 Coruba Jamaica Rum
 Appleton Special Jamaica Rum
 Appleton Estates Jamaica Rums:
 Signature
 8 Year Old Reserve
 12 Year Old Rare Casks
 15 Year Old Black River Casks
 Master Blender's Legacy
 21 Year Old Nassau Valley Casks
 Blackwell Rum
 Koko Kanu

In addition to their many rums, Wray and Nephew also produces an Old Tom Gin.

References

Food and drink companies of Jamaica
Companies established in 1825
Distilleries
Jamaican brands
Jamaican rum
Campari Group